"Put Em in Their Place" is the second single from Mobb Deep's Blood Money album. The song is produced by Havoc, Ky Miller, and Sha Money XL.

Background
This song was featured on Entourage episode Guys and Doll when Johnny and Turtle invade Dom's room to look for the missing doll. The clean version of this song appeared on Prison Break episode called Dirt Nap.  A remix featuring Houston rapper Bun B later appeared on their 2008 mixtape More Money, More Murda.

Despite the album being criticized by fans, this song is one of the more well acclaimed tracks of the album.

This song is also featured in the video game Skate 3 (2010).

Track listing
"Put Em in Their Place" [clean version]
"Put Em in Their Place" [dirty version]
"Put Em in Their Place" [instrumental]
"Put Em in Their Place" [a cappella]

Charts

References

2006 songs
2006 singles
Mobb Deep songs
G-Unit Records singles
Song recordings produced by Havoc (musician)
Songs written by Prodigy (rapper)
Songs written by Havoc (musician)